Bande noire may refer to:
 La Bande noire: property speculators of post-revolutionary France
 La Bande noire, the 1823 ode by Victor Hugo on the same
 Bande noire (art), The circle around the 19th century French painter Charles Cottet, also known as Nubians